Larisa Zavarzina (born 24 December 1955) is a rower who competed for the Soviet Union. She was a 1982 World Champion who also competed at the 1980 Summer Olympics in Moscow with the women's coxless pair where they came fifth.

References

1955 births
Living people 
Russian female rowers
Olympic rowers of the Soviet Union
Rowers at the 1980 Summer Olympics
World Rowing Championships medalists for the Soviet Union